Mummie is an unincorporated community located in Jackson County, Kentucky, United States. Their post office  has been closed.

The town was named after the first settlers discovered a mummified human body.

References

Unincorporated communities in Jackson County, Kentucky
Unincorporated communities in Kentucky